The 1995–96 Philadelphia Flyers season was the Philadelphia Flyers 29th season in the National Hockey League (NHL). In the Spectrum's final season the Flyers repeated as Atlantic Division champs and clinched the top seed in the Eastern Conference, but the Flyers lost in the Conference Semifinals to the Florida Panthers in six games.

Regular season
Building on the success of the lockout season, the Flyers began the year with a 7–1 rout in Montreal over the Canadiens. An early 5–0–1 stretch was derailed in a 5–4 loss to Chicago on October 22, in which Dominic Roussel turned in a poor performance in net. It would be one of several in the early going which forced head coach Terry Murray to favor Garth Snow as the backup to Ron Hextall.

Lindros was hurt in early November, and the club limped to a 2–4–1 record in his absence. However, after his return they ripped off eight straight wins as part of a 12–2–2 stretch which put them in contention in the Atlantic Division with the Florida Panthers. However, the momentum switched and the club struggled to a 3–6–7 record thereafter.

A 3–2 home overtime win over Montreal on February 1, in which defenseman Petr Svoboda was elbowed in the head by Marc Bureau, finally lit a fire under the team. In addition, the trade-deadline acquisition of Dale Hawerchuk, who was needed in Mikael Renberg's absence, spurred a 13–3–0 charge at the end of the season. Thanks to a 6–5 Bruins win over the Penguins on the final day, the Flyers gained the top spot in the Eastern Conference following a 3–1 win over Tampa.

Lindros hit the 100-point mark in a 3–0 win over Hartford on March 25, while LeClair netted his 50th goal of the season in a 5–1 win in New Jersey on April 10. In an ironic twist, Avalanche forward Claude Lemieux notched the game-winning goal on a fluke shot in a Colorado 5–3 win in Philly on February 11. With the Devils the previous June, Lemieux hit the net from 50 feet out to give his club a 3–2 win in Game 5 of the conference finals.

On April 2, the Flyers scored three short-handed goals in a 6-2 win over the New York Islanders.

On April 11, the Flyers organization celebrated the final regular-season game in the Spectrum. The home team took care of their end, topping the Canadiens 3–2. After the game, an emotional torch-passing ceremony saw past and present team members skating alongside each other, with a symbolic transference of leadership from Bobby Clarke to Lindros.

Season standings

Playoffs
With the top spot in the Eastern Conference, the Flyers drew their division rival, the Tampa Bay Lightning, coached by former Flyer Terry Crisp. After a 7–3 Philly home rout in Game 1, Lightning goalie Daren Puppa was spectacular and Brian Bradley notched the OT winner in a 2–1 Game 2 triumph. Former draft pick Alexander Selivanov ended Game 3 in Tampa with an overtime goal. Hawerchuk and LeClair provided leadership and goals in a 4–1 road win in Game 4, then the Flyers won 4–1 in Game 5 at the Spectrum. The Flyers closed out the series with a 6–1 score in Game 6 at the Thunderdome.

Next up in the conference semifinals were the Florida Panthers, a team which relied on goaltender John Vanbiesbrouck and the neutral zone trap for success. Vanbiesbrouck posted a 2–0 shutout in Game 1, and it took until midway through Game 2 for the Flyers to get rolling offensively in a narrow 3–2 win. Game 3 saw Flyers veterans Dan Quinn, Hawerchuk, Desjardins and Hextall set the tone in a 3–1 victory.

The Flyers were defeated in overtime in Game 4 and double-overtime in Game 5. The Panthers ended the Flyers' season in Game 6.

Schedule and results

Regular season

|- style="background:#cfc;"
| 1 || October 7 || @ Montreal Canadiens || 7–1 || 1–0–0 || 2 || 
|- style="background:#cfc;"
| 2 || October 11 || Washington Capitals || 2–1 || 2–0–0 || 4 || 
|- style="background:#cfc;"
| 3 || October 14 || @ New York Islanders || 3–0 || 3–0–0 || 6 || 
|- style="background:#cfc;"
| 4 || October 15 || Edmonton Oilers || 7–1 || 4–0–0 || 8 || 
|- style="background:#ffc;"
| 5 || October 18 || @ Los Angeles Kings || 1–1 OT || 4–0–1 || 9 || 
|- style="background:#cfc;"
| 6 || October 20 || @ Mighty Ducks of Anaheim || 4–2 || 5–0–1 || 11 || 
|- style="background:#fcf;"
| 7 || October 22 || @ Chicago Blackhawks || 4–5 || 5–1–1 || 11 || 
|- style="background:#cfc;"
| 8 || October 25 || New York Islanders || 3–1 || 6–1–1 || 13 || 
|- style="background:#ffc;"
| 9 || October 28 || @ New York Islanders || 5–5 OT || 6–1–2 || 14 || 
|- style="background:#cfc;"
| 10 || October 29 || Ottawa Senators || 5–2 || 7–1–2 || 16 || 
|- style="background:#ffc;"
| 11 || October 31 || Tampa Bay Lightning || 2–2 OT || 7–1–3 || 17 || 
|-

|- style="background:#fcf;"
| 12 || November 2 || Florida Panthers || 1–2 || 7–2–3 || 17 || 
|- style="background:#fcf;"
| 13 || November 4 || @ Pittsburgh Penguins || 4–7 || 7–3–3 || 17 || 
|- style="background:#cfc;"
| 14 || November 5 || Hartford Whalers || 6–1 || 8–3–3 || 19 || 
|- style="background:#fcf;"
| 15 || November 7 || @ Florida Panthers || 2–4 || 8–4–3 || 19 || 
|- style="background:#cfc;"
| 16 || November 9 || Calgary Flames || 3–1 || 9–4–3 || 21 || 
|- style="background:#fcf;"
| 17 || November 11 || @ New Jersey Devils || 2–4 || 9–5–3 || 21 || 
|- style="background:#fcf;"
| 18 || November 12 || New Jersey Devils || 2–3 || 9–6–3 || 21 || 
|- style="background:#ffc;"
| 19 || November 14 || @ Washington Capitals || 2–2 OT || 9–6–4 || 22 || 
|- style="background:#cfc;"
| 20 || November 16 || Ottawa Senators || 5–3 || 10–6–4 || 24 || 
|- style="background:#cfc;"
| 21 || November 18 || @ Hartford Whalers || 4–2 || 11–6–4 || 26 || 
|- style="background:#cfc;"
| 22 || November 19 || Vancouver Canucks || 3–2 OT || 12–6–4 || 28 || 
|- style="background:#cfc;"
| 23 || November 21 || Los Angeles Kings || 5–2 || 13–6–4 || 30 || 
|- style="background:#cfc;"
| 24 || November 24 || Detroit Red Wings || 4–1 || 14–6–4 || 32 || 
|- style="background:#cfc;"
| 25 || November 29 || @ Florida Panthers || 2–1 OT || 15–6–4 || 34 || 
|- style="background:#cfc;"
| 26 || November 30 || Toronto Maple Leafs || 3–2 || 16–6–4 || 36 || 
|-

|- style="background:#cfc;"
| 27 || December 3 || Boston Bruins || 6–1 || 17–6–4 || 38 || 
|- style="background:#fcf;"
| 28 || December 5 || @ Detroit Red Wings || 3–5 || 17–7–4 || 38 || 
|- style="background:#cfc;"
| 29 || December 7 || Buffalo Sabres || 7–3 || 18–7–4 || 40 || 
|- style="background:#fcf;"
| 30 || December 10 || New York Islanders || 2–6 || 18–8–4 || 40 || 
|- style="background:#cfc;"
| 31 || December 14 || Tampa Bay Lightning || 4–0 || 19–8–4 || 42 || 
|- style="background:#cfc;"
| 32 || December 16 || @ Montreal Canadiens || 4–2 || 20–8–4 || 44 || 
|- style="background:#cfc;"
| 33 || December 17 || Pittsburgh Penguins || 6–5 || 21–8–4 || 46 || 
|- style="background:#fcf;"
| 34 || December 19 || @ New Jersey Devils || 4–5 OT || 21–9–4 || 46 || 
|- style="background:#fcf;"
| 35 || December 21 || New York Rangers || 1–2 || 21–10–4 || 46 || 
|- style="background:#ffc;"
| 36 || December 23 || @ Hartford Whalers || 3–3 OT || 21–10–5 || 47 || 
|- style="background:#fcf;"
| 37 || December 27 || @ Edmonton Oilers || 2–3 || 21–11–5 || 47 || 
|- style="background:#cfc;"
| 38 || December 29 || @ Calgary Flames || 3–2 || 22–11–5 || 49 || 
|- style="background:#ffc;"
| 39 || December 31 || @ Vancouver Canucks || 5–5 OT || 22–11–6 || 50 || 
|-

|- style="background:#cfc;"
| 40 || January 3 || @ San Jose Sharks || 3–1 || 23–11–6 || 52 || 
|- style="background:#ffc;"
| 41 || January 4 || @ Colorado Avalanche || 2–2 OT || 23–11–7 || 53 || 
|- style="background:#ffc;"
| 42 || January 9 || Mighty Ducks of Anaheim || 2–2 OT || 23–11–8 || 54 || 
|- style="background:#ffc;"
| 43 || January 11 || St. Louis Blues || 4–4 OT || 23–12–9 || 55 || 
|- style="background:#fcf;"
| 44 || January 13 || New York Rangers || 0–4 || 23–13–9 || 55 || 
|- style="background:#cfc;"
| 45 || January 15 || Dallas Stars || 6–1 || 24–13–9 || 57 || 
|- style="background:#ffc;"
| 46 || January 22 || Florida Panthers || 1–1 OT || 24–12–10 || 58 || 
|- style="background:#ffc;"
| 47 || January 24 || @ New York Rangers || 4–4 OT || 24–12–11 || 59 || 
|- style="background:#fcf;"
| 48 || January 27 || @ Pittsburgh Penguins || 4–7 || 24–13–11 || 59 || 
|- style="background:#fcf;"
| 49 || January 28 || @ Washington Capitals || 2–3 OT || 24–14–11 || 59 || 
|-

|- style="background:#cfc;"
| 50 || February 1 || Montreal Canadiens || 3–2 OT || 25–14–11 || 61 || 
|- style="background:#cfc;"
| 51 || February 3 || @ St. Louis Blues || 7–3 || 26–14–11 || 63 || 
|- style="background:#fcf;"
| 52 || February 8 || Buffalo Sabres || 1–2 || 26–15–11 || 63 || 
|- style="background:#cfc;"
| 53 || February 10 || @ Boston Bruins || 6–2 || 27–15–11 || 65 || 
|- style="background:#fcf;"
| 54 || February 11 || Colorado Avalanche || 3–5 || 27–16–11 || 65 || 
|- style="background:#cfc;"
| 55 || February 14 || @ Florida Panthers || 4–2 || 28–16–11 || 67 || 
|- style="background:#fcf;"
| 56 || February 17 || @ Tampa Bay Lightning || 2–5 || 28–17–11 || 67 || 
|- style="background:#cfc;"
| 57 || February 19 || New Jersey Devils || 4–1 || 29–17–11 || 69 || 
|- style="background:#cfc;"
| 58 || February 22 || Washington Capitals || 5–3 || 30–17–11 || 71 || 
|- style="background:#fcf;"
| 59 || February 23 || @ Buffalo Sabres || 2–7 || 30–18–11 || 71 || 
|- style="background:#cfc;"
| 60 || February 25 || Chicago Blackhawks || 3–2 || 31–18–11 || 73 || 
|- style="background:#ffc;"
| 61 || February 28 || @ Dallas Stars || 4–4 OT || 31–18–12 || 74 || 
|-

|- style="background:#cfc;"
| 62 || March 1 || @ Ottawa Senators || 3–2 || 32–18–12 || 76 || 
|- style="background:#fcf;"
| 63 || March 3 || @ Washington Capitals || 0–3 || 32–19–12 || 76 || 
|- style="background:#fcf;"
| 64 || March 9 || @ Boston Bruins || 2–3 || 32–20–12 || 76 || 
|- style="background:#fcf;"
| 65 || March 10 || New Jersey Devils || 2–3 OT || 32–21–12 || 76 || 
|- style="background:#ffc;"
| 66 || March 13 || Tampa Bay Lightning || 1–1 OT || 32–21–13 || 77 || 
|- style="background:#cfc;"
| 67 || March 16 || Winnipeg Jets || 3–0 || 33–21–13 || 79 || 
|- style="background:#cfc;"
| 68 || March 17 || San Jose Sharks || 8–2 || 34–21–13 || 81 || 
|- style="background:#cfc;"
| 69 || March 19 || New York Islanders || 4–1 || 35–21–13 || 83 || 
|- style="background:#fcf;"
| 70 || March 22 || @ Winnipeg Jets || 1–4 || 35–22–13 || 83 || 
|- style="background:#cfc;"
| 71 || March 23 || @ Toronto Maple Leafs || 4–0 || 36–22–13 || 85 || 
|- style="background:#cfc;"
| 72 || March 25 || Hartford Whalers || 3–0 || 37–22–13 || 87 || 
|- style="background:#cfc;"
| 73 || March 27 || @ Ottawa Senators || 4–2 || 38–22–13 || 89 || 
|- style="background:#cfc;"
| 74 || March 29 || @ Buffalo Sabres || 6–5 OT || 39–22–13 || 91 || 
|- style="background:#cfc;"
| 75 || March 31 || Pittsburgh Penguins || 4–1 || 40–22–13 || 93 || 
|-

|- style="background:#cfc;"
| 76 || April 2 || @ New York Islanders || 6–2 || 41–22–13 || 95 || 
|- style="background:#cfc;"
| 77 || April 4 || New York Rangers || 4–1 || 42–22–13 || 97 || 
|- style="background:#fcf;"
| 78 || April 5 || @ New York Rangers || 1–3 || 42–23–13 || 97 || 
|- style="background:#fcf;"
| 79 || April 7 || Boston Bruins || 2–4 || 42–24–13 || 97 || 
|- style="background:#cfc;"
| 80 || April 10 || @ New Jersey Devils || 5–1 || 43–24–13 || 99 || 
|- style="background:#cfc;"
| 81 || April 11 || Montreal Canadiens || 3–2 || 44–24–13 || 101 || 
|- style="background:#cfc;"
| 82 || April 14 || @ Tampa Bay Lightning || 3–1 || 45–24–13 || 103 || 
|-

|-
| Legend:

Playoffs

|- style="background:#cfc;"
| 1 || April 16 || Tampa Bay Lightning || 7–3 || 17,380 || Flyers lead 1–0 || 
|- style="background:#fcf;"
| 2 || April 18 || Tampa Bay Lightning || 1–2 OT || 17,380 || Series tied 1–1 || 
|- style="background:#fcf;"
| 3 || April 21 || @ Tampa Bay Lightning || 4–5 OT || 25,945 || Lightning lead 2–1 || 
|- style="background:#cfc;"
| 4 || April 23 || @ Tampa Bay Lightning || 4–1 || 28,183 || Series tied 2–2 || 
|- style="background:#cfc;"
| 5 || April 25 || Tampa Bay Lightning || 4–1 || 17,380 || Flyers lead 3–2 || 
|- style="background:#cfc;"
| 6 || April 27 || @ Tampa Bay Lightning || 6–1 || 27,189 || Flyers win 4–2 || 
|-

|- style="background:#fcf;"
| 1 || May 2 || Florida Panthers || 0–2 || 17,380 || Panthers lead 1–0 || 
|- style="background:#cfc;"
| 2 || May 4 || Florida Panthers || 3–2 || 17,380 || Series tied 1–1 || 
|- style="background:#cfc;"
| 3 || May 7 || @ Florida Panthers || 3–1 || 14,703 || Flyers lead 2–1 || 
|- style="background:#fcf;"
| 4 || May 9 || @ Florida Panthers || 3–4 OT || 14,703 || Series tied 2–2 || 
|- style="background:#fcf;"
| 5 || May 12 || Florida Panthers || 1–2 2OT || 17,380 || Panthers lead 3–2 || 
|- style="background:#fcf;"
| 6 || May 14 || @ Florida Panthers || 1–4 || 14,703 || Panthers win 4–2 || 
|-

|-
| Legend:

Player statistics

Scoring
 Position abbreviations: C = Center; D = Defense; G = Goaltender; LW = Left Wing; RW = Right Wing
  = Joined team via a transaction (e.g., trade, waivers, signing) during the season. Stats reflect time with the Flyers only.
  = Left team via a transaction (e.g., trade, waivers, release) during the season. Stats reflect time with the Flyers only.

Goaltending
  = Left team via a transaction (e.g., trade, waivers, release) during the season. Stats reflect time with the Flyers only.

Awards and records

Awards

Records

Among the team records set during the 1995–96 season was Eric Lindros setting the franchise single game record with 14 shots on goal on March 19. The Flyers tied the team record for most shorthanded goals in a single game (3) on April 2. Lindros’ 1.58 points per game average during the regular season is a franchise high. The team’s four overtime losses during the 1996 Stanley Cup playoffs is tied for the NHL record.

Milestones

Transactions
The Flyers were involved in the following transactions from June 25, 1995, the day after the deciding game of the 1995 Stanley Cup Finals, through June 11, 1996, the day of the deciding game of the 1996 Stanley Cup Finals.

Trades

Players acquired

Players lost

Signings

Draft picks

Philadelphia's picks at the 1995 NHL Entry Draft, which was held at Edmonton Coliseum in Edmonton, Alberta, on June 28, 1995. The Flyers traded their third-round pick, 74th overall, and Mark Recchi to the Montreal Canadiens for Eric Desjardins, Gilbert Dionne and John LeClair on February 9, 1995. They also traded their fifth-round pick, 126th overall, to the Detroit Red Wings for Stewart Malgunas on September 9, 1993.

Farm teams
The Flyers were affiliated with the Hershey Bears of the AHL and the Mobile Mysticks of the ECHL.

Notes

References
General
 
 
 
Specific

P
P
1995
Philadelphia
Philadelphia